New Money Honey (foaled May 1, 2014) is an American Thoroughbred racehorse and the winner of the 2016 Breeders' Cup Juvenile Fillies Turf.

Career

New Money Honey's first race was on September 5th, 2016 at Saratoga, where she came in 2nd. She won her next race, which was her first graded race - the Miss Grillo Stakes on October 2nd, 2016.

New Money Honey got the biggest win of her career by winning the 2016 Breeders' Cup Juvenile Fillies Turf. New Money Honey then picked up another win on July 8th, 2017 at the Belmont Oaks Invitational Stakes.

New Money Honey competed in the Alabama Stakes, the Queen Elizabeth II Challenge Cup Stakes and the American Oaks in 2017, but could not place in the top three in either race.

New Money Honey won the last race of her career on July 21st, 2017, at Belmont Park. New Money Honey retired in October 2018, due to her owners not wanting to risk injury. New Money Honey was put in foal to  War Front in 2019.

Pedigree

References

2014 racehorse births